Bristol Rovers F.C. spent the 1991–92 season in the Football League Second Division.

League table

Bristol Rovers F.C. seasons
Bris